Luca Clemenza (born 9 July 1997) is an Italian footballer who plays as a midfielder for  club Virtus Entella.

Club career

Juventus

Loan to Ascoli 
On 11 August 2017, Clemenza was loaned to Serie B club Ascoli on a season-long loan deal. On 26 August he made his Serie B debut for Ascoli as a substitute replacing Gianmarco De Feo in the 62nd minute of a 3–2 away defeat against Cittadella. On 3 September, Clemenza played his first match as a starter, a 1–0 home win over Pro Vercelli, he was replaced by Enrico Baldini in the 59th minute. On 21 October he played his first entire match for Ascoli, a 1–1 away draw against Ternana. On 9 December, Clemenza scored his first professional goal in the third minute of a 1–1 home draw against Virtus Entella. On 24 February 2018 he scored his second goal in the 51st minute of a 2–1 home win over Cesena. Clemenza ended his loan to Ascoli with 30 appearances, 2 goals and 7 assists.

Loan to Padova 
On 17 August 2018, Clemenza was signed by Serie B side Padova on a season-long loan deal. On 27 August he made his debut for Padova in a 1–1 away draw against Hellas Verona, he was replaced by Jérémie Broh in the 89th minute. One week later, on 1 September he played his first entire match for Padova, a 1–0 home win over Venezia. On 23 September he scored his first goal for Padova in the 26th minute of a 1–1 home draw against Cremonese. On 30 December he scored his second goal for the club in the 47th minute of a 1–1 away draw against Livorno. Clemenza ended his season-long loan to Padova with 22 appearances, 2 goals and 2 assists.

Loan to Pescara
On 31 January 2020, he joined Serie B club Pescara on loan.

Loan to Sion
On 12 October 2020, Clemenza signed to Swiss club Sion. Upon his return from Sion he was assigned to Juventus U23 for the 2021–22 season.

Second loan to Pescara
On 31 August 2021, he returned to Pescara on another loan, with the club now in Serie C. On 12 July 2022, Pescara bought him.

Virtus Entella
On the same day, Pescara re-sold his rights to Virtus Entella in Serie C, with Facundo Lescano moving in the opposite direction as part of the transfer.

International career 
Clemenza represented Italy at Under-16, Under-17 and Under-20 level. On 4 September 2012 he made his debut at U-16 level as a substitute replacing Valerio Trani in the 41st minute of a 3–1 away defeat against Switzerland U-16. On 30 August 2013 he made his debut at U-17 level as a substitute replacing Giuseppe Panico in the 57th minute of a 1–0 home defeat against Portugal U-17. On 22 March 2018, Clemenza made his debut at U-20 level in a 1–0 away defeat against Czech Republic U-20, he was replaced by Ferdinando Del Sole in the 84th minute.

Career statistics

Club

Honours 
Juventus Primavera
 Torneo di Viareggio: 2016

References

External links 

 

Living people
1997 births
People from Cittiglio
Footballers from Lombardy
Association football midfielders
Italian footballers
Italian expatriate footballers
Italy youth international footballers
F.C. Arzignano Valchiampo players
Juventus F.C. players
Ascoli Calcio 1898 F.C. players
Calcio Padova players
Juventus Next Gen players
Delfino Pescara 1936 players
FC Sion players
Virtus Entella players
Serie B players
Serie C players
Italian expatriate sportspeople in Switzerland
Expatriate footballers in Switzerland
Sportspeople from the Province of Varese